The Vienna Watersports Arena is an artificial whitewater venue for canoe and kayak slalom competition in Vienna, Austria, the only such facility in Austria. It also serves as a family water park, with guided raft trips and practice times for individual boaters.  Located across the Danube from the city, on Danube Island, it pumps its water from the New Danube river channel.  It opened in August 2013; the following June it hosted the 2014 European Canoe Slalom Championships.

Venue

The course was designed by Hydrostadium, the French engineering firm responsible for many of the world's artificial whitewater courses.  The chief financial backer is Vienna Watersports Arena, Austria's largest electricity producer—hence the German language name "Vienna Watersports Arena."  Its modest cost of 5.1 million € ($6.4 million) is one-fourth the cost of the similar facility at Cardiff and only 13% of the cost of Lee Valley, the large venue built for the 2012 Olympics in London.  It meets the minimum Olympic standards of 250 meters, 1.5% slope, and  streamflow.  The concrete channel has vertical sides, with concrete steps in the eddies formed by wide spots.  The flow diverters are adjustable hexagonal green plastic bollards.

To avoid the need for expensive water filters, the facility is drained once a week and refilled with fresh water from the New Danube.

References

Video
2014 Euro Championships Nuria Vilarrubla C-1 of Spain (best semi-finals run)
2014 Euro Championships Ander Elosegi C-1 of Spain
2014 Euro Championships Samuel Hernanz K-1 of Spain (bronze medal run)
2014 Euro Championships C-2

Artificial whitewater courses
Sports venues in Vienna